Anna Maria Theodora Petra "Annemarie" Verstappen (born 3 October 1965, in Rosmalen) is a female former freestyle swimmer from the Netherlands.

Swimming career
Verstappen won a total number of three medals at the 1984 Summer Olympics in Los Angeles, United States. In 1982, she became world champion in the 200 metres freestyle at the World Aquatics Championships in Ecuador. At the end of that same year, she was named Dutch Sportswoman of the Year. In July 1983, she broke the world record in the 50 m freestyle.

Despite being of Dutch nationality she won the 200 metres medley title in 1981 at the ASA National British Championships.

Personal life
Her son Vincent Janssen is a professional football player.

See also
 World record progression 50m freestyle
 List of Olympic medalists in swimming (women)
 List of World Aquatics Championships medalists in swimming (women)

References

External links
 Dutch Olympic Committee
 

1965 births
Living people
Olympic swimmers of the Netherlands
Swimmers at the 1984 Summer Olympics
Olympic silver medalists for the Netherlands
Olympic bronze medalists for the Netherlands
People from Rosmalen
World record setters in swimming
Olympic bronze medalists in swimming
Dutch female freestyle swimmers
World Aquatics Championships medalists in swimming
European Aquatics Championships medalists in swimming
Medalists at the 1984 Summer Olympics
Olympic silver medalists in swimming
Sportspeople from North Brabant
20th-century Dutch women